The women's 1000 metres in short track speed skating at the 2010 Winter Olympics began on 24 February, with the final held on 26 February, at the Pacific Coliseum.

Records
Prior to the competition, the existing world and Olympic records were as follows.

The following records were established during the competition:

Results

Heats

Quarterfinals

Semifinals

Finals

Final B (Classification Round)

Final A (Medal Round)

External links
 2010 Winter Olympics results: Ladies' 1000 m (heats), from http://www.vancouver2010.com/; retrieved 2010-02-25.
 2010 Winter Olympics results: Ladies' 1000 m (1/4 finals), from http://www.vancouver2010.com/; retrieved 2010-02-25.
 2010 Winter Olympics results: Ladies' 1000 m (semifinals), from http://www.vancouver2010.com/; retrieved 2010-02-25.
 2010 Winter Olympics results: Ladies' 1000 m (finals), from http://www.vancouver2010.com/; retrieved 2010-02-25.

Women's short track speed skating at the 2010 Winter Olympics